The Chicago Hub Network is a collection of proposed fast conventional and high-speed rail lines in the Midwestern United States including  of track. Since the 1990s, there have been multiple proposals to build a network from Chicago to destinations such as Milwaukee, Madison, Minneapolis, Indianapolis, Detroit, Kansas City, St. Louis, Cleveland,  Cincinnati, and Louisville. In addition, the rail lines from the Chicago hub would connect through to cities in Canada. Eastern routes from Chicago would also blend into the Ohio Hub network. In addition to providing better connections between Midwestern cities, the projects are intended to reduce or eliminate the operating subsidies that American passenger train routes currently require.

If implemented, the plans would have some of the nation's fastest trains in Chicago, as it had in the 1930s and 1940s when the Twin Zephyrs, Twin Cities 400, and Hiawatha were based in the city. Chicago is North America's largest rail hub, and remains unsurpassed in the total number of passenger and freight trains that converge on any city on the continent. Chicago is a major hub for Amtrak, with 15 different lines terminating at the city's Union Station.

The Chicago–St. Louis rail line is being upgraded so passenger trains will be able to reach top speeds of  when traveling between Joliet and Carlinville.

Early studies and ISTEA corridors
Renewed interest in high-speed rail occurred by the year 1990 when the Minnesota–Wisconsin–Illinois Tri-State Rail Study was underway.  A Chicago–Milwaukee–Madison–La Crosse–Rochester–Twin Cities "southern corridor" (a variation of the former Hiawatha routing) and a Chicago–Milwaukee–Green Bay–Wausau–Eau Claire–Twin Cities "northern corridor" were described in a preliminary report in December of that year.  A final report was released in May 1991 and recommended TGV-class  service since it provided the greatest benefit to riders and others in the corridor, though a slower (and less expensive)  "Amtrak upgrade" option was also deemed reasonable for capital-constrained investments.

The Intermodal Surface Transportation Efficiency Act of 1991  (ISTEA) was passed on December 18, 1991, and requested designation of up to five corridors.  A core of what would become the Chicago Hub Network was the first of these five to be announced by Secretary of Transportation Andrew Card on October 15, 1992, who designated Chicago-based routes to Milwaukee, St. Louis, and Detroit.

Midwest Regional Rail Initiative
In 2004, the Midwest Regional Rail Initiative plan was released, focusing on upgrading existing Amtrak routes. The plan had been in development since 1996, led by the Wisconsin Department of Transportation. Raising the speed would significantly reduce trip times. A trip between Milwaukee and Chicago would be reduced from about 90 minutes to just over an hour. The trip from the Twin Cities to Chicago would drop from 8 hours to 5½ hours. Travelers between Chicago and Cincinnati would see the biggest gains, cutting travel time in half to just 4 hours.

If implemented, planners would expect 13.6 million annual riders by the year 2025. The frequency of train trips would also be increased: areas that currently only see one train in each direction every day would be upgraded to four or six trips each way.

The total investment required for the system, paying for infrastructure as well as rolling stock, was estimated at $7.7 billion in 2002 dollars.  $1.1 billion of that would go toward purchasing 63 new train sets.  Plans at the time called for phased construction taking about a decade.

This plan is expected to use diesel-powered trains, which is one reason for the relatively low top speed in comparison to high-speed lines in Europe and elsewhere. Higher speeds require electrification, which can double the cost of building a rail line, though trains on such lines benefit from higher efficiency leading to lower fuel costs, and the ability to accelerate and decelerate more rapidly which boosts rail line capacity.

2009 Midwest High Speed Rail Association proposal
For 2009, the Midwest High Speed Rail Association (MHSRA) and other organizations requested new studies of possible rail routes in the Midwest, this time with  service as the goal. These routes were identified:

Chicago–Milwaukee–Madison–Rochester–Minneapolis/St. Paul-St. Cloud-Fargo-Bismarck
Chicago–Champaign–Springfield–St. Louis
Chicago–Gary–Lafayette–Indianapolis–Cincinnati
Cincinnati–Dayton–Columbus–Cleveland
Chicago–Gary–Fort Wayne–Toledo–Detroit
Chicago–Gary–Fort Wayne–Toledo–Cleveland-Erie-Buffalo
Cleveland–Pittsburgh

The MHSRA funded a study of the link from Chicago to St. Louis, while the Southeast Minnesota Rail Alliance funded a study of the route to Minneapolis/St. Paul—the third in a series previously funded by the Illinois, Wisconsin, and Minnesota Departments of Transportation.

2009 SNCF proposal
In late 2009, the French national rail company SNCF released studies of several rail corridors in the United States in California, Florida, Texas, and the Midwest.  France has a population distribution similar to that in the Midwest, so their experiences with TGV trains and other high-speed systems could conceivably be duplicated in the U.S.  The following routes were identified for a first phase of implementation:

Chicago–Milwaukee–Madison–Eau Claire–Minneapolis/St. Paul
Chicago–Bloomington/Normal–Springfield–St. Louis
Chicago–Gary–Lafayette–Indianapolis–Cincinnati
Chicago–Gary–Fort Wayne–Toledo–Detroit
Chicago–Gary–Fort Wayne–Toledo–Cleveland

These routes were designed to allow them to overlay the Midwest Regional Rail Initiative plan. The total cost was projected at $68.5 billion in 2009 dollars, with 54% of that projected to need public financing if a public-private partnership was pursued. The public funds could be recovered from revenues in about 15 years.

Upgrades underway
Some construction has begun in Illinois and Michigan, primarily as testbeds for the upgraded signaling and control systems required for higher-speed rail. Similar work on the Chicago–Saint Louis line in Illinois was met with considerable technical difficulties in 2005, though work continued.

In September 2008, the federal government provided $297,000 to fund a study of the plan; Amtrak and state governments matched these funds for a total of $594,000. Planners anticipate 13.6 million riders over the entire network by the year 2025.

The Chicago to Milwaukee Hiawatha Service was planned to be expanded to Madison, Wisconsin, but the project was then nixed in 2011 by then  Wisconsin governor Scott Walker.  In 2009, the Spanish manufacturer Talgo had agreed to open a plant in Wisconsin in order to build 110-mph trains for the Hiawatha route and other improved corridors; however, due to the cancellation of construction in Wisconsin, Talgo has scaled back plans from a manufacturing plant to a maintenance facility, leading the City of Milwaukee to consider legal action against the state.

American Recovery and Reinvestment Act of 2009
In 2009, the federal government allocated $8 billion in the American Recovery and Reinvestment Act to be divided up among rail projects around the country.  States in the Midwest made 24 applications to the government, and on January 28, 2010, the White House announced that the Chicago network would receive money for three of its requests, and two other grants were made to Midwestern states.  The Chicago-based routes receiving funding were:

$1.131 billion for Chicago–St. Louis–Kansas City ($1.1 billion for Chicago–St. Louis, $31 million for St. Louis–Kansas City)
$823 million for Chicago–Milwaukee–Madison–Minneapolis/St. Paul  ($810 million for Milwaukee–Madison, $12 million for Chicago–Milwaukee, remaining $600,000 to study possible alignments to the Twin Cities.)
$244 million for Chicago–Pontiac–Detroit

An additional $400 million was released for the 3C corridor in Ohio connecting Cleveland, Columbus, Dayton, and Cincinnati, and $17 million was allocated to Iowa.  Many of the corridors receiving funding at this time were originally designated as high-speed rail corridors following the 1991 ISTEA legislation.

2010
In October 2010, the Chicago Hub received more money from the FY 2010 High Speed Rail Allocation. The major grants were:
$230 million for Chicago–Quad Cities–Iowa City
$161 million for Chicago–Detroit

Following the 2010 gubernatorial elections in Wisconsin and Ohio, both newly elected governors repeated their intentions of shutting down the projects in these two states and returning the money to the federal government. Following the return of funds, the federal government redirected the $145 million intended for Wisconsin and Ohio to the State of Washington's high-speed rail corridor, and to Connecticut to modernize the New Haven-Springfield Line.

Chicago-St. Louis rail line upgrades
Before the upgrades, Amtrak passenger trains had a top speed of 79 MPH on the line between Chicago and St. Louis, and freight trains had a top speed of 60 MPH. In the fall of 2012, the section of the Chicago-St. Louis line between Pontiac, Illinois, and Dwight, Illinois, began Amtrak service at 110 MPH, as a demonstration section. In 2014 construction began to upgrade the entire rail line between Carlinville, Illinois, and Joliet, Illinois, so that Amtrak could run its passenger trains at 110 MPH. In addition, freight trains will be able to operate at 70 MPH.

The entire cost of the high-speed rail program was estimated at $1.8 billion, with the federal government committing $1.6 billion of that, later lowered to $1.4 billion. It is estimated that $1.2 billion will be spent on the program by the end of 2016. 

This reduced travel time by 15 minutes between the two cities. Amtrak hopes to upgrade the line to  operation by June 2023 which would save an additional 45 minutes in travel time.

See also 
 Chicago–Detroit Line
 High-speed rail in the United States
 Midwest High Speed Rail Association
 Northern Lights Express
 Rochester Rail Link

References

External links
Federal Railroad Administration: Chicago Hub Network
INDOT High Speed Passenger Rail Initiative
Mn/DOT: Midwest Regional Rail Initiative
WisDOT: Midwest Regional Rail System Executive Report, September 2004
ODOT/ORDC: The Ohio Hub
Midwest High Speed Rail Association
Indiana High Speed Rail Association
Illinois High Speed Rail
A Minnesota or St. Paul,MN owned organisation, On-Board Mid-West
Connect the Midwest Website

Passenger rail transportation in Illinois
Passenger rail transportation in Indiana
Passenger rail transportation in Iowa
Passenger rail transportation in Michigan
Proposed railway lines in Minnesota
Proposed railway lines in Missouri
Passenger rail transportation in Nebraska
Passenger rail transportation in Ohio
Passenger rail transportation in Wisconsin
High-speed railway lines in the United States
Midwestern United States
Passenger rail transportation in Kentucky